Josia neblina is a moth of the  family Notodontidae. It is only known from Cerro Neblina in southern Venezuela.

External links
Species page at Tree of Life project

Notodontidae of South America
Moths described in 2009